Guilherme Carvalho dos Santos (born 22 June 2002) is a Brazilian professional basketball player for Santa Cruz Warriors of the NBA G League.

Professional career

Minas (2018–2022)
Santos made his professional debut with Minas of the Novo Basquete Brasil (NBB) during the 2018–19 season. Two years later, he entered the starting lineup. In April 2021, Santos was named to the World Team for the Nike Hoop Summit. On April 21, he declared for the 2021 NBA draft.

On September 3, 2021, Santos scored a career-high 34 points for Minas' U20 team in a 72–77 away win over Flamengo U20. 

In the 2021–22 season, Santos was named the NBB Sixth Man of the Year after he averaged 10.1 points and 5.1 rebounds over the season.

Santa Cruz Warriors (2022–present)
Santos was selected by the Golden State Warriors with the 55th overall pick in the 2022 NBA draft. He joined the Warriors for the 2022 NBA Summer League, and he later joined their NBA G League affiliate, the Santa Cruz Warriors. Santos was named to the G League's inaugural Next Up Game for the 2022–23 season.

National team career
Santos helped Brazil win a gold medal at the 2019 FIBA South America Under-17 Championship in Chile. He scored 27 points against Argentina in the final. Santos made his senior national team debut during 2022 FIBA AmeriCup qualification.

Personal life
Santos' father, Deivisson, is a former professional basketball player who played five seasons in the NBB. His mother, Lucineide, was also a basketball player.

References

External links
 Novo Basquete Brasil profile

2002 births
Living people
Brazilian men's basketball players
Golden State Warriors draft picks
Minas Tênis Clube basketball players
Sportspeople from Brasília
Small forwards